A foreign exchange derivative is a financial derivative whose payoff depends on the foreign exchange rates of two (or more) currencies. These instruments are commonly used for currency speculation and arbitrage or for hedging foreign exchange risk.

History
Foreign exchange transactions can be traced back to           the fourteenth Century in the UK, but the coming into being and development of foreign exchange derivatives market was in the 1970s with the historical background and economic environment. 
Firstly, after the collapse of the Bretton Woods system, in 1976, IMF held a meeting in Jamaica and reached the Jamaica agreement. When the floating exchange-rate system replaced a fixed exchange-rate system, many countries relaxed control of interest rates and the risk of financial market increased. In order to reduce and avoid risks and achieve the purpose of hedging, modern financial derivatives came into being.
Secondly, economic globalization promoted the globalization of financial activities and financial markets. After the collapse of the Bretton Woods system, much capital flew across the world. Countries generally relaxed restrictions on domestic and foreign financial institutions and foreign investors. Changes in macroeconomic factors led to market risk and the demand for foreign exchange derivatives market increasing further, what promoted the development of the derivatives market.
Under such circumstances, financial institutions continue to create new financial tools to meet the needs of traders for avoiding the risk. Therefore, many foreign exchange derivatives were widely used, making the foreign exchange market expand from the traditional transactions market to the derivatives market, and develop rapidly.（Unknown, 2012）

Specific foreign exchange derivatives, and related concepts include:

Instruments
Basis swap
Currency future
Currency swap
Foreign exchange binary option
Foreign exchange forward
Foreign exchange option
Foreign exchange swap
Forward exchange rate
Non-deliverable forward
Power reverse dual-currency note

Basic features
Margin trading，which means you could pay part of margin but make full transaction without the practically transferring of your principal. The end of contract mostly adopt the settlement for differences. At the same time, the buyers need not present full payment only when the physical delivery gets performed on the maturity date. Therefore, the characters of trading financial derivatives include the lever effect. When margin decreases, the risk of trading will increase, as the lever effect will increase. (Ma Qianli, 2011)

Basic function
【Avoiding and managing systemically financial risk.】 According to statistics, the systemic risk accounts for 50% in the risk of financial market investment in developed countries, so preventing and mitigating systemic financial risks is vital in management of financial institutions. All traditional risk-management tools (insurance, asset-liability management, portfolio etc.) cannot prevent systemic risk, while foreign exchange derivatives can efficiently avoid systemic risk, which is brought by the adverse change of the prices in basic goods market, by its specific hedging function.

【Increasing financial systems’ ability to resist risk.】 Financial derivatives, which contain functions to avoid and shift risk, can transfer the risk to individuals with more risk tolerance. The process turns financial risk that would be excessive for weak-risk-tolerance companies to withstand to small or intermediate impact for powerful enterprises, while some might be converted to speculators’ chances to make profit. It strengthens financial system’s overall win-resisting ability and consolidates this system’s robustness.

【Improving economic efficiency. It mainly refers to raise the efficiency of business running and financial market.】 The former is embodied as providing business with tools to prevent the risk of finance, reducing the founding cost and increasing economic benefits. The latter reflected as it enriches and completes financial market system by countless kinds of products, reduces the occurrence of asymmetric information, realizes the desirable arrangement of risk, increases the efficiency in pricing, etc.

Trading schemes
【Foreign forward swap transaction trading】 The parties of a swap contract agree to periodically swap capital in some time.

【Foreign exchange option trading】 The contract can agree the option holder to exchange it at a defined price as his right instead of an obligation.

【Forward exchange futures transaction trading】 Future contract’s buyers or sellers submit margin at the beginning of trading, as a kind of buffering mechanism. The margin needs to make corresponding adjustment on time according to the price of contract.

【Forward forex exchange trading】 Similar to futures, but it is an unstandardized agreement without the margin requirement.(Lu Lei, 2008)

Risk and return
Foreign exchange derivatives can allow investors to engage in risk avoidance to keep value, but also can earn profit through speculation. This kind of specific duality makes derivatives more uncontrollable. Thus, foreign exchange derivative products can be risky while rewardable.(Chen Qi, 2009); in addition speculative transactions in the financial market are considered negatively and potentially damaging to the real economy.

Concepts
Carry trade
Covered interest arbitrage
Foreign exchange hedge
Foreign exchange market
Foreign exchange risk
Foreign exchange spot
Interest rate parity
Uncovered interest arbitrage

Foreign exchange market
Derivatives (finance)
Foreign exchange reserves